Tauno Majuri (1907–1980) was a Finnish stage and film actor. He was married to the actress Kaisu Leppänen.

Selected filmography
 The Face in the Mirror (1953)

References

Bibliography 
 Pietari Kääpä. Directory of World Cinema: Finland. Intellect Books, 2012.

External links 
 

1907 births
1980 deaths
Finnish male film actors
Actors from Vyborg